Wukirasih Sawondari (born 20 November 1980) is a retired Indonesian tennis player.

She was coached by Suzanna Wibowo, and made her debut as a professional in December 1993, aged 13, at an  ITF tournament in Singapore.

Sawondari was part of Indonesia Fed Cup team in 1997, 1998, 2000, 2001 and 2002.

At the 2002 Asian Games, she was part of Indonesia's successful women's team.

At the 2011 Southeast Asian Games, Sawondari represented Indonesia in the sport of soft tennis. She won three gold medals, in women's singles, women's doubles, and women's team.

ITF finals

Singles (2–1)

Doubles (11–6)

External links
 
 

Indonesian female tennis players
1980 births
Living people
Tennis players at the 2002 Asian Games
Asian Games medalists in tennis
Asian Games gold medalists for Indonesia
Medalists at the 2002 Asian Games
Southeast Asian Games gold medalists for Indonesia
Southeast Asian Games medalists in tennis
Competitors at the 2011 Southeast Asian Games
Southeast Asian Games medalists in soft tennis
21st-century Indonesian women